Kundi is a village situated in Sarsawa block,  Saharanpur district of Uttar Pradesh state, India. It is about 21.5 km from Saharanpur city and 30 km from Yamunanagar city.

References 

Villages in Saharanpur district